Dr. Strange Records is a record label and record store located in Alta Loma, California. It started out as an apartment-based distro in 1988 and became a record label in 1989, run out of the "Doc's" apartment until 1997, when the store was first opened.

The company is located in the historic Alta Loma post office, built in 1906, at 7136 Amethyst Street (at the northwest corner of the intersection with Lomita Drive).

The label features many well known punk bands.

Bands 
 The Bollweevils
 The BillyBones
 Black Market Baby
 Broken Bones
 Brown Lobster Tank
 Channel 3
 External Menace
 Face to Face
 Flux Of Pink Indians 
 The Freeze
 The Frustrators
 Gameface
 Government Issue
 Guttermouth
 Ill Repute 
Jim Threat and the Vultures
 Mad Parade
 Manson Youth
 The Marshes
 Mandingo
 My Favorite Band
 Narcoleptic Youth
 999
 The Partisans
 Peter and the Test Tube Babies
 Rhythm Collision
 Riot/Clone
 Schleprock
 Sinkhole
 Skankin' Pickle 
 Symbol Six (band)
 The Skulls
 Tank 
 Texas Thieves
 The Threats
 The Voids
 Voodoo Glow Skulls
 Whatever
 Mad Parade
Zoinks!

References

External links 
Official site

American record labels
Record labels established in 1988
Punk record labels